Črešnjevec ob Dravi is a small settlement on the left bank of the Drava River in the Municipality of Selnica ob Dravi in Slovenia.

References

External links
Črešnjevec ob Dravi on Geopedia

Populated places in the Municipality of Selnica ob Dravi